The  is a botanical garden located at 3583 Banchi, Tanagida, Himi, Toyama, Japan. It is open daily except Tuesdays; an admission fee is charged.

The garden opened in 1996 beside Matsudae-no-Nagahama, a seaside promenade along a beach of white sands and green pines mentioned in the Man'yōshū. It is set within a striking building designed by architect Itsuko Hasegawa.

The garden specializes in seaside plants, and features a greenhouse with water tank of mangroves, tropical and subtropical plants, climbing plants, seaside plants from various places in Japan, and an insect exhibit.

See also 
 List of botanical gardens in Japan

References 
 Himi Seaside Botanical Garden
 Himi Seaside Botanical Garden (Japanese)
 Toyama Museums description
 Zhulong.com description with photos
 International Archive of Women in Architecture

Botanical gardens in Japan
Gardens in Toyama Prefecture
Himi, Toyama